Baruch Adonai L'Olam is a paragraph recited during Shacharit in Pesukei Dezimra following Hallel. The paragraph consists of verses beginning with the word Baruch (ברוך), Hebrew for "Blessed," which states that God is a source of blessing and alludes to the covenant between God and the Jewish People. It is recited following Hallel as a way to relate Hallel to blessing.

The paragraph consists of four verses: Verse 53 from Psalm 89, verse 21 from Psalm 135, and verses 18-19 from Psalm 72.

The word Amen is recited twice in the first verse as an emphasis on this word. The word Amen can have three meanings: to accept a vow upon oneself, to acknowledge the truth of a statement, and the expression of hope that a prayer will come true.

References

Pesukei dezimra
Shacharit
Hebrew words and phrases in Jewish prayers and blessings
Siddur of Orthodox Judaism